is a Japanese seismologist, amateur astronomer and a discoverer of minor planets and comets.

Kushida is the founder of the Yatsugatake South Base Observatory. He is credited by the Minor Planet Center with the discovery of 56 numbered minor planets during 1988–1994, most of them in collaboration with astronomer Osamu Muramatsu, as well as with Masaru Inoue and with his wife Reiki Kushida. He also discovered and co-discoverer the two periodic comets 144P/Kushida and 147P/Kushida-Muramatsu, respectively.

The main-belt asteroid 5605 Kushida, discovered by Satoru Otomo at Kiyosato in 1993, was named in his honor. Naming citation was published on 28 July 1999.

List of discovered minor planets

References

External links 
 http://www.nayoro-star.jp/photo/tenmondai-houmon/kushida.html (in Japanese)
 https://web.archive.org/web/20081010041555/http://www.obusession.com/guest/guest058.htm

1957 births
Discoverers of asteroids

20th-century Japanese astronomers
Living people
People from Hachiōji, Tokyo